Rab Nawaz (born 17 October 1940) is a former Pakistani cricketer and umpire. He stood in two ODI games between 1982 and 1984.

See also
 List of One Day International cricket umpires

References

1940 births
Living people
Pakistani One Day International cricket umpires
Cricketers from Lahore
Pakistani cricketers
Pakistan Railways cricketers